Alma Hasanić Grizović (born 13 May 1989) is a Bosnian-Norwegian retired handball player.

Grizović was born in Tešanj, SR Bosnia and Herzegovina to Bosnian parents, and was raised in Norway. She made her debut on Norway women's national handball team on 8 June 2014, against South Korea. Because the goalkeeper competition was hard on the Norwegian team, she decided to try out for Montenegrin national team, as she had family who was Montenegrin.

She competed for Montenegro at the 2015 World Women's Handball Championship in Denmark, finishing 8th.

Achievements
Norwegian Championship:
Winner: 2013/14, 2014/15, 2015/16, 2016/17
Norwegian Cup:
Winner: 2013/14, 2014/15, 2015/16

References

External links
 

1989 births
Living people
Montenegrin female handball players
People from Tešanj
Expatriate handball players
Norwegian female handball players
Bosniaks of Montenegro